Gaibandha-2 is a constituency represented in the Jatiya Sangsad (National Parliament) of Bangladesh since 2008 by Mahabub Ara Begum Gini of the Awami League.

Boundaries 
The constituency encompasses Gaibandha Sadar Upazila.

History 
The constituency was created in 1984 from the Dinajpur-2 constituency when the former Dinajpur District was split into three districts:Panchagarh, Thakurgaon, and Dinajpur.

Member Of Parliament

Elections

Elections in 2010s

Elections in 2000s

Elections in 1990s

References

External links
 

Parliamentary constituencies in Bangladesh
Gaibandha District
1984 establishments in Bangladesh